The Vande Bharat Express, formerly known as Train 18, is a high-performance, electric multiple-unit train operated by Indian Railways. It was designed by RDSO and manufactured by the government-owned Integral Coach Factory (ICF), located in Chennai.

On 27 January 2019, Train 18 was renamed the Vande Bharat Express in honor of the fact that the train was manufactured entirely in India. It was made with low-cost maintenance and operational optimization in mind. The train went into service on 15 February 2019.

Vande Bharat express remains the most profitable and lucrative business for Indian railways, with the highest occupancy rate of 130%.

Vande Bharat Express design and specifications has been standardized by RDSO,

History

Background
The Vande Bharat Express is based on Mainline Electric Multiple Unit (MEMU) trainsets, of which the standard design has been in service since the mid-1990s. The Integral Coach Factory has manufactured MEMU technology for the last 25 years.  As a supplement for the long-distance Vande Bharat Express, a modified MEMU was built incorporating Vande Bharat technology for suburban, commuter and short-distance intercity runs. 

In June 2015, Indian Railways issued a bid for train manufacturing, but no bid met the necessary criteria, leading to the decision to manufacture trains independently in India.

Two new trains were announced to be manufactured at ICF and were named "Train-2018" due to the targeted completion date.

Manufacturing first set
The manufacture of "Train-2018" was completed in October 2018.

Trial runs 
On 29 October 2018, the first trial took place in Chennai. The brakes and air conditioning were tested, and the crew was familiarized with key control systems. An official from Indian Railways said that, during the low-speed run in Chennai, "some fuses went off," but the problem was small and easy to fix. The second round of testing was scheduled in Delhi on 7 November 2018, and final trails were to be held on Kota–Sawai Madhopur. The train was pulled by a locomotive that left on 11 November and arrived in Delhi on 13 November.

On 17 November 2018, testing was scheduled to begin along a stretch of track between Bareilly and Moradabad in Uttar Pradesh. Due to a problem on this part of the track, the location was changed to Moradabad–Rampur. The train was then moved to a section of track on Kota–Sawai Madhopur to be tested at operating speed. A team of six officials was put together by India's Research Design and Standards Organization (RDSO), which supervised the testing and gave the go-ahead for the final speed test.

The specific energy consumption(sec) of gross ton/km was 15.4kWh, which is lesser than other Indian trains. As per simulation done at the ICF, the specific energy consumption of Shatabdi Express was 17.2 kWh per gross ton/km.

Inauguration

"Train 18" was inaugurated on 15 February 2019 after four years of planning, manufacturing, and testing. It was soon renamed "Vande Bharat Express" by the railway minister. Prime Minister Narendra Modi flagged off the inaugural run on 15 February 2019, with the commercial run starting on 17 February 2019. It runs on the Delhi–Varanasi route, via Kanpur and Prayagraj, connecting Varanasi to the capital city and reducing travel time along the route by 15%. The train's regenerative brakes are also expected to allow a 30% saving in electricity cost as compared to its predecessor.

2019–present
On 14 December 2019, after the success of the New Delhi–Varanasi route and the later New Delhi–Katra route, the Railway Board approved the production of 45 new Vande Bharat train sets by 2022.

Production was slowed down because of the COVID-19 pandemic, which cut annual production capacity by 12.5%, and because of other administrative problems. Despite this, the Union minister decided to move ahead with the schedule and asked the officials to build 10 trains by August 2022.

In January 2021, Indian Railways placed orders for 44 second-generation Vande Bharat train sets.

In the Union Budget for 2022, Finance Minister Nirmala Sitharaman announced that the government would manufacture 400 more Vande Bharat trains over the next three years.

The Indian Railways had ordered 36,000 wheels for Vande Bharat trainsets from Ukraine for US$16 million. Supplies were disrupted due to the 2022 Russian invasion of Ukraine. The Indian Railways also placed orders with companies based in the Czech Republic, Poland, Malaysia, China, and the United States to ensure an undisrupted supply of wheels.

In May 2022, the Indian Railways hired the Steel Authority of India (SAIL) to produce 100,000 wheels at its Durgapur steel plant.

In May 2022, the Indian Railways will build wheels at the Rail Wheel Factory in India that could make 80,000 wheels for high-speed trains each year. SAIL, Durgapur and RINL, Forged Wheel Plant, Uttar Pradesh will also produce Make in India wheels for Vande Bharat express.

Ramkrishna Forgings-Titagarh Wagons consortium lowest bidder for supplying wheels to Railways. the consortium will set up a state-of-the-art manufacturing facility in India for forged wheel production and will supply approximately 1.6-million-wheel discs of different rolling stocks of the Indian Railways over a period of 20 years, at about 80,000 wheels per annum.

Speed and Acceleration
Chennai–Mysuru is even slower but is planned to be increased.

The Vande Bharat Express has the fastest acceleration on the Indian rail network. According to Western Railway, the first and second versions achieve  in 145 seconds and 129 seconds, respectively.

Train versions

Vande Bharat 1.0 (VB1) 
As part of the "Make in India" initiative, the Integral Coach Factory (ICF), under the direction of Sudhanshu Mani, created and produced the Vande Bharat. It was originally called "Train 18". On 26 January 2019, Railway Minister Piyush Goyal announced that the train would be named the Vande Bharat Express.

The outside of the Vande Bharat Express has an aerodynamic design that is meant to reduce air resistance at high speeds. It has a driver's cabin at each end, so it can move more quickly between stations. The trainset weighs 430 tonnes, and has 16 passenger cars with a seating capacity of 1,128 passengers. Two of the centre compartments are first-class compartments that seat 52 each, with the rest being coach compartments seating 78 each. The chassis of a coach is 23 meters long, and the frame of the train is made entirely of stainless steel. Alternate coaches are motorized to ensure an even distribution of power and quicker acceleration and deceleration. The cars are interconnected and fully sealed to allow better mobility between coaches and reduce noise. The train features a GPS-based passenger information system, bio-vacuum toilets, and rotational seats that can be aligned in the direction of travel (only in executive class). Vande Bharat employs a regenerative braking system.

Trains are equipped with  television screens that serve as the passenger information and entertainment system.

The assembly of the train takes eight weeks. About 80–85% of the components that go into making Vande Bharat are indigenously sourced. Among the imported components are the wheels, seats, doors, braking system, transformers, and electronic parts such as processing chips, with plans to produce them domestically. The train's seats were imported from Spain, and the wheels were imported from Ukraine.

Indian Railways and ICF were also planning the development of Train 20, an upgraded version of Train 18 intended to replace the Rajdhani Express. The new train was planned to have an aluminium body with sleeper coaches.

Vande Bharat 2.0 (VB2) 

VB2 is lighter, weighing 392 tonnes compared to 430 tonnes for the previous version. Trains are equipped with larger 32-inch television screens and have Wi-Fi onboard. The air conditioning system on the VB2 utilizes 15% less energy than the system on the first Vande Bharat train set. VB2 also has automatic plug doors, sliding doors that don't need to be touched, emergency communication units, accessible toilets, a bigger driver's cabin, and seats in all coaches that can be leaned back. To address the seat reclining issues of the previous version, the new chairs were equipped with a push-back arrangement for smooth reclining.

The VB2 is additionally equipped for safety and protection with Kavach signaling technology, which is similar to ETCS Level 2. The second version of this train offers enhanced amenities, seats, security, and surveillance systems, as well as features suited for emergency situations. The new rolling stock will be outfitted with new rakes that feature four emergency windows, disaster lights in all coaches in the event of lighting system failure, fire survival cables within door circuits, ventilation for three hours in the event that the air conditioner loses power, and four additional emergency push buttons per coach. The new coaches are also set to be equipped with a centralized Coach Monitoring System for all types of electricity and climate control, among other new additions.

On 9 September 2022, the trial runs for the VB2 train were completed. The first VB2 rake entered service on 30 September 2022. Indian Railways has ordered 102 VB2 train sets in total. As of October 2022, four VB2 train sets have been built, and about half a dozen are under production at ICF. Sudhanshu Mani said, "Now that ICF has already developed four such trains and gotten the hang of the process, they can easily roll out three to four trains per month and around 40 by 15 August next year."

Vande Bharat 3.0 (VB3) (Train 20) 

The Vande Bharat 3 trainset will introduce sleeper coaches for the first time. It will have three classes: AC-1, AC-2, and AC-3. These trainsets are intended for Train 20 services.

The VB3 is expected to be lighter and more energy efficient than the VB2, as well as have better passenger amenities.

Half of the VB3 train sets have coaches made of steel, while the other half have coaches made of aluminum with articulated bogies.

Vande Bharat 4.0 (VB4) 
VB4 coaches will be made of a lightweight aluminium alloy. The VB4 is expected to feature improved passenger amenities such as a 3-pin socket and USB power socket for every passenger, zero discharge toilet systems, and facilities to accommodate passengers traveling in wheelchairs.

At least half of all VB4 train sets are expected to be tilting trains, marking the first commercial deployment of the technology in India. The first VB4 set is expected to enter service in 2026.

Production 
As part of the Make in India initiative, Sudhanshu Mani led the team at the Integral Coach Factory (ICF) that designed and made the Vande Bharat. A total of two first-generation Vande Bharat trainsets were built by the ICF.

Indian Railways first floated a tender to manufacture 44 VB2 rakes in July 2020. The agency refloated the tender three times, with the fourth (and final) tender being floated in September 2020. The tender was floated under the Atmanirbhar Bharat initiative and required 75% of the components to be locally sourced. Indian Railways received three bids for the tender and awarded a  contract to Hyderabad-based Medha Servo Drives to manufacture 44 Vande Bharat train sets on 21 January 2021. Medha will build the rakes at ICF (24 rakes), Rail Coach Factory, Kapurthala and Modern Coach Factory, Raebareli (10 rakes each).

Indian Railways floated a tender to manufacture an additional 58 VB2 rakes on 28 August 2021. The seven companies are Medha Servo Drives, Alstom, Siemens, Bharat Heavy Electricals Limited (BHEL), Titagarh Wagons, Saini Electricals and CGL. The ICF will supervise the manufacture of 26 of the 58 rakes. Medho Servo Drives will build propulsion systems under ICF oversight. Siemens will supply propulsion systems to manufacture 16 rakes at the Modern Coach Factory, and Alstom will supply propulsion systems for nine trains to be built at the Rail Coach Factory. BHEL will supply components for four trainsets, while CGL, Saini Electricals, and Titagarh Wagons will build one rake each. All 7 of these rakes will also be built at the ICF.

Indian Railways invited bids to design and manufacture 200 VB3 trainsets in April 2022. The agency estimated that it would cost   The estimate includes the cost of upgrading infrastructure at either the Marathwada Rail Coach Factory in Latur or the ICF where the VB3 is planned to be manufactured. A further  will be paid to the winning bidders over a 35 year period for maintenance. The bidders would be required to build the first prototype VB3 trainset within 24 months of being awarded the contract.

Indian Railways floated tenders to manufacture and maintain 200 VB4 trainsets in July 2022. The production to be soon commenced at MCF, Rae Baraeli and later at the Rail Coach Naveenikaran Karkhana (RCNK), Sonipat and Marathwada Rail Coach Factory(MRCF), Latur.

Rail Vikas Nigam Limited has already built the automatic line with Industry 4.0 complaint plant at Rail Coach Naveenikaran Karkhana (RCNK), Sonipat for assembling and de-assembling of vande bharat bogies. RVNL will also do the up-gradation of the government manufacturing units and trainset depots as per stated in a stock exchange filing.

Modern Coach Factory, Rae Baraeli has a production target of 10 rakes for FY2023-24.
Russia’s JSC Metrowagonmash with RITES JV got the lowest bid for 120 Vande Bharat trains as L1 bidder for each rolling stock cost at Rs. 120 crores each with a total bid value of Rs 14,400 crore, Rail Vikas Nigam Limited (RVNL), a railway public sector enterprise got manufacturing and maintenance of 200 Vande Bharat trains at Rs. 120 crores each is also a separate L1 bidder with a total bid value of Rs. 24,000 crores and BHEL & Titagarh Wagons JV as L2 bidder got 80 Vande Bharat trains for manufacturing and maintenance with a total bid value of Rs 9,600 crore.

Services

In Service 
The following table provides the list of trains in service as of March 2023

Upcoming services and most probable services

Seater 
 Kacheguda – Bengaluru
 Secunderabad – Tirupati
 Secunderabad – Pune replacing Shatabdi Express 
 KSR Bengaluru – Dharwad via Hubballi
 Jabalpur - Bhopal - Indore  
 Howrah – Bhubaneswar/ Sri Jagannath Puri - not clear if it will replace Shatabdi Express or not
 New Delhi – Gurgaon - Jaipur
 Hyderabad – Nagpur
 Jaipur - Indore 
 Mumbai - Goa 
 Chennai Egmore – Madurai
 Thiruvananthapuram – Mangaluru
 Chennai - Coimbatore 
 Coimbatore – SMVT Bengaluru
 New Delhi – Amritsar by replacing one of the Shatabdi Express
 New Delhi – Lucknow by replacing Shatabdi Express
 New Delhi – Rani Kamalapati by replacing Shatabdi Express
 Howrah – Ranchi by replacing Shatabdi Express
 Howrah - Rourkela via Kharagpur, Tatanagar, Chakradharpur
 Howrah – Varanasi
 Howrah/Kolkata – Patna

Some of them may replace Shatabdi Express trains

Unknown configuration 
 New Delhi – Patna 
 Thiruvananthapuram – Bengaluru  
 Ernakulam – Chennai

Sleeper 
 New Delhi – Mumbai 
 Chhatrapati Shivaji Maharaj Terminus – Firozpur Cantonment
 Varanasi – Chhatrapati Shivaji Maharaj Terminus
 New Delhi – Howrah
 Howrah - Chhratrapati Shivaji Maharaj Terminus

Rake formation

Abbreviations:

 DTC - Driving Trailer Coach
 NDTC - Non-Driving Trailer Coach
 MC - Motor Coach
 MC2 - Motor Coach with electrical change-over switch
 MC3 - 180° rotated MC2
 TC - Trailer Coach having Pantograph
 EC - Executive Chair Car (2x2 seats)
 CC - Economy Chair Car (3x2 seats)

Export
After the train's inauguration, the Indian Railways reportedly received queries of interest from some countries in Southeast Asia and South America. A Board Member of the Indian Railways stated that the train can be modified according to customer needs. A Railways official stated in November 2022 that the Ministry of Railways was preparing a roadmap to begin exports of Vande Bharat trainsets by 2026. Exports would only begin after 475 trainsets are built for domestic use.

The track is expected to be completed by January 2024. The Railways will use the track to test trainsets that are designed to be exported to countries that use standard gauge railways.

See also

References

External links 

Named passenger trains of India
Higher-speed rail
Express trains in India